The R517 is a Regional Route in Limpopo, South Africa.

Route
Its north-western terminus is at a junction with the R510 near Bulge River. From there, heads south-east to the town of Vaalwater, where it ends at a junction with the R33.

References

Regional Routes in Limpopo